Jing Lusi (Chinese: 陆思敬; born 16 May 1985) is a British actress. She is best known for her roles in Stan Lee's Lucky Man, the 2018 hit film Crazy Rich Asians and BAFTA nominated series Gangs of London. On stage, Lusi was part of the original cast of the European premiere of Amy Herzog's play 4000 Miles. She has presented for the BBC, as well as being the focus, for the documentaries My Chinese New Year (2015) and Chinese New Year: The Biggest Celebration on Earth (2016).

Early life and education
Lusi was born on 16 May 1985 in Pudong, Shanghai, and moved with her parents to the United Kingdom at the age of five. Her family settled in Southampton, her father having been granted a scholarship to study a master's degree at the university. She studied at Peter Symonds College, Winchester, then read law at University College London.

Career 
Lusi's first television role was in the BBC's BAFTA award-winning medical drama series Holby City. She made her debut in 2012, playing Tara Lo. In 2013, Lusi left the cast when her character died during neurosurgery, her final episode airing on 16 April 2013. She has starred in TV shows such as Stan Lee's Lucky Man as the villainous Lily-Anne Lau alongside James Nesbitt, played detectives in Scott & Bailey and Gangs of London, and has made guest appearances in shows like Matthew Weiner's anthology series The Romanoffs. 

In films, Lusi has starred in the action thriller Survivor alongside Milla Jovovich, Pierce Brosnan, Dylan McDermott and Robert Forster, Warner Bros box office hit Crazy Rich Asians and SAS: Red Notice with Sam Heughan, Ruby Rose and Tom Hopper, based on the book Red Notice by Andy McNab. 

On stage, Lusi performed as Amanda in the Pulitzer Prize shortlisted play 4000 Miles at the Theatre Royal, Bath and The Print Room in London in 2013, for which she received critical acclaim. The Independent described her performance as, "cruelly well observed, and very funny... Jing Lusi nails the narcissism and the ridiculous, relentless self-promotion of the Facebook age".

Lusi performed at Edinburgh Fringe Festival 2015 as part of a collective of comedians in Immigrant Diaries; a comedy story telling show aimed to 'show a different side' to the heaviness of the topic during the General Election of the same year.

In 2015–16, Lusi hosted the Chinese New Year celebrations in Trafalgar Square.

She was the subject of the BBC1 My Chinese New Year which was broadcast on 1 March 2015.

Filmography

References

External links 

Living people
1985 births
Actresses from Southampton
Alumni of University College London
British actresses of Chinese descent
Chinese emigrants to the United Kingdom
British film actresses
People educated at Peter Symonds College
British television actresses
21st-century British actresses
Actresses from Shanghai